ORP Poznań (824) is a Lublin-class minelayer-landing ship of Polish Navy, named after the city of Poznań.

Construction and career 
The ship was commissioned on 8 March 1991 and incorporated into the 2nd Minelaying and Transport Unit of the 8th Coastal Defence Flotilla based in Świnoujście. This ship has taken part in several international exercises, including Strong Resolve 2002, Blue Game 2003, BALTOPS 2004, and BALTOPS 2005. While participating in Anakonda 2006, Poznań served as the flagship for the commander of the 8th Flotilla.

In 2003, on the 12th anniversary of Poznańs commissioning, a plaque bearing the city of Poznań's coat of arms was placed on the ship.

ORP Poznań sailed almost 60,000 nautical miles, took part in the largest military maneuvers in the Baltic Sea, North Sea and the Atlantic, twice won the title of the best unit of the 8th Coastal Defense Flotilla in Świnoujście, on March 8, 25 years have passed since Poznań first flag was raised.

Gallery

References

Lublin-class minelayer-landing ships
1990 ships
Ships built in Gdańsk